Senator Lumpkin may refer to:

Alva M. Lumpkin (1886–1941), U.S. Senator from South Carolina in 1941
Wilson Lumpkin (1783–1870), U.S. Senator from Georgia from 1837 to 1841